Rex Elvie Allen Sr. (December 31, 1920 – December 17, 1999), known as "the Arizona Cowboy", was an American film and television actor, singer and songwriter; he was also the narrator of many Disney nature and Western productions. For his contributions to the film industry, Allen received a motion pictures star on the Hollywood Walk of Fame in 1975, located at 6821 Hollywood Boulevard.

Early life
Allen was born to Horace E. Allen and Luella Faye Clark on a ranch in Mud Springs Canyon, forty miles from Willcox in Cochise County in southeastern Arizona, United States. As a boy he played guitar and sang at local functions with his fiddle-playing father, until high-school graduation when he toured the Southwest as a rodeo rider. He got his start in show business on the East Coast.

Early career

Allen began his singing career on radio station KOY in Phoenix, Arizona, after which he became better known as a performer on the National Barn Dance on WLS in Chicago.

When singing cowboys such as Roy Rogers and Gene Autry were very much in vogue in American film, in 1949 Republic Pictures in Hollywood gave him a screen test and put him under contract. Beginning in 1950, Allen starred as himself in 19 of Hollywood's Western movies. One of the top-ten box office draws of the day, whose character was soon depicted in comic books, on screen Allen personified the clean cut, God-fearing American hero of the Wild West, who wore a white Stetson hat, loved his faithful horse Koko, and had a loyal buddy who shared his adventures. Allen's comic-relief sidekick in his first few pictures was Buddy Ebsen and then character actor Slim Pickens.

Personal life
In 1940, Allen married Doris Windsor, with whom he had one child (Rexine Allen). His second marriage was to Bonnie Linder (m. 1946–1973), with whom he had four children. His third and final marriage was to Virginia Hudson, on November 25, 1992. The couple divorced in 1999.

His five children included Rex Allen Jr., who became a singer like his father.

Later career
Allen wrote and recorded many songs, a number of which were featured in his own films. Late in coming to the industry, his film career was relatively short as the popularity of series westerns faded by the mid 1950s. But he starred in a number of B-Westerns during the 1950s.

As other cowboy stars made the transition to television, Allen tried too, cast as Dr. Bill Baxter for the half-hour weekly syndicated series Frontier Doctor. In 1961, he was one of five rotating hosts for NBC-TV's Five Star Jubilee.

Allen had a rich, pleasant voice, ideally suited for narration, and was able to find considerable work as a narrator in a variety of films, especially for Walt Disney Pictures wildlife films and television shows. The work earned him the nickname, "The Voice of the West." He narrated The Legend of Lobo, The Incredible Journey, Yellowstone Cubs, Run, Appaloosa, Run, and Charlie, the Lonesome Cougar. He also was the voice of the father on Walt Disney's Carousel of Progress, first presented at the 1964 World's Fair and now at Walt Disney World. A 1993 renovation replaced Allen with Jean Shepherd as the voice of the father, but Allen was given a cameo as the grandfather in the final scene.

Allen provided the narration for the 1973 Hanna-Barbera animated film Charlotte's Web.  He was also the voice behind Purina Dog Chow commercials for many years.  After moving to Sonoita, Arizona, in the early 1990s, he was a viable voice talent almost until his death, recording hundreds of national advertising voice tracks at his favorite Tucson studio, Porter Sound.  In his later years he also performed frequently with actor Pedro Gonzalez-Gonzalez. He wrote and sang the theme song for the early 1980s sitcom Best of the West.

Death
Allen died on December 17, 1999, in Tucson, Arizona. He had collapsed in his driveway after suffering a heart attack and was then accidentally run over by his caregiver. Cremated, his ashes were scattered at Railroad Park in Willcox.

Legacy

For his contribution to the motion picture industry, Allen was given a star on the Hollywood Walk of Fame at 6821 Hollywood Boulevard.

In 1983, he was inducted into the Western Performers Hall of Fame at the National Cowboy and Western Heritage Museum in Oklahoma City, Oklahoma.

In 1989, his life story was told in the book Rex Allen: My Life, Sunrise to Sunset – The Arizona Cowboy, written by Paula Simpson-Witt and Snuff Garrett.

The Rex Allen Arizona Cowboy Museum and Willcox Cowboy Hall of Fame in Willcox features an Allen's collection of memorabilia, including photos, movie posters, cowboy outfits, records and musical instruments. His cremated ashes were scattered in Railroad Park, across the street from the museum, near a bronze statue of Allen.

Allen was a cousin of the Gunsmoke cast member Glenn Strange, who played bartender Sam Noonan. His son, Rex Allen, Jr., is a singer.

Discography

Albums

Singles

Partial filmography

 The Arizona Cowboy (1950) as himself
 Hills of Oklahoma (1950) as himself
 Redwood Forest Trail (1950) as himself
 Under Mexicali Stars (1950) as himself aka Mike Jordan
 Trail of Robin Hood (1950) as himself
 Silver City Bonanza (1951) as himself
 Thunder in God's Country (1951) as himself
 Rodeo King and the Senorita (1951) as himself
 Utah Wagon Train (1951) as himself
 Colorado Sundown (1952) as himself
 The Last Musketeer (1952) as himself
 Border Saddlemates (1952) as himself
 I Dream of Jeanie (1952) as Mr. Tambo
 Old Oklahoma Plains (1952) as himself
 South Pacific Trail (1952) as himself
 Old Overland Trail (1953) as himself
 Iron Mountain Trail (1953) as himself
 Sweethearts on Parade (1953) as Jim Riley (singing voice, uncredited)
 Down Laredo Way (1953) as himself
 Shadows of Tombstone (1953) as himself
 Red River Shore (1953) as himself
 Phantom Stallion (1954) as himself
 The Wetback Hound (1957, Short) as narrator (voice)
 The Hound That Thought He Was a Raccoon (1960) as narrator (voice)
 For the Love of Mike (1960) as himself
 Tomboy and the Champ (1961) as himself
 The Legend of Lobo (1962) as narrator
 Yellowstone Cubs (1963) as narrator (voice)
 The Incredible Journey (1963) as narrator (voice)
 Swamp Country (1965) as Sheriff Jim Turner
 Run, Appaloosa, Run (1966) as narrator
 Charlie, the Lonesome Cougar (1967) as narrator
 Charlotte's Web (1973) as narrator (voice)
 Starbird and Sweet William (1973) as narrator (voice)
 Vanishing Wilderness (1974, Documentary) as narrator
 The Secret of Navajo Cave (1976) as narrator

See also
 List of actors with Hollywood Walk of Fame motion picture stars

References

Bibliography
 Green, D.B. (1998). "Rex Allen." In The Encyclopedia of Country Music. P. Kingsbury, Ed. New York: Oxford University Press. p. 10.

External links
 
 
 
 Rex Allen Arizona Cowboy Museum and Willcox Cowboy Hall of Fame Web site
 Rex Allen Days Web site
 City of Wilcox Web site
 Rex Allen in action at the Iverson Movie Ranch in Frontier Doctor
 Iverson Movie Ranch: History, vintage photos.
 Rex Allen recordings at the Discography of American Historical Recordings.

1920 births
1999 deaths
People from Willcox, Arizona
Country musicians from Arizona
American country singer-songwriters
American male film actors
American male singer-songwriters
Singing cowboys
American male television actors
Vaudeville performers
American male voice actors
Mercury Records artists
Jamie Records artists
Shasta Records artists
Pedestrian road incident deaths
Road incident deaths in Arizona
Burials in Arizona
20th-century American male actors
20th-century American singers
Decca Records artists
20th-century American male singers
Singer-songwriters from Arizona
Golden Boot Awards recipients